Naomi C. Matusow (born October 31, 1938) is an American lawyer and politician from New York.

Life
She was born on October 31, 1938, in Nashville, Tennessee. She graduated B.A. from Vanderbilt University in 1960. Then she taught mathematics at public schools in New York City. While teaching, she also attended New York University and graduated M.A. in 1966. She graduated J.D. from Pace University School of Law in 1979, was admitted to the bar in 1981, and practiced law, first in Armonk, and later in White Plains, both in Westchester County.

She also entered politics as a Democrat, and was a member of the New York State Assembly (89th D.) from 1993 to 2002, sitting in the 190th, 191st, 192nd, 193rd and 194th New York State Legislatures. In September 2002, she ran for renomination but was defeated in the Democratic primary by Adam Bradley.

References

1938 births
Living people
People from Armonk, New York
Women state legislators in New York (state)
Democratic Party members of the New York State Assembly
Vanderbilt University alumni
Politicians from Nashville, Tennessee
Pace University School of Law alumni